Grace Kaudha,  also known as Grace Hailat Kaudha Magumba, (born on 14 October 1986) was a Ugandan politician and a legislator who was the Women's Representative for Iganga district in the 10th parliament of Uganda in 2016.  She was affiliated with the National Resistance Movement. 

She died at Mulago National Referral Hospital in Kawempe on Saturday 1 July 2017 at 2:00 o'clock. Her death is said to have been caused by a condition called pre-eclampsia caused by pregnancy complications. She was laid to rest in Magogo village, Nawaningi sub-county in Iganga district.

Career 
She was the Women's Representative of Iganga district who replaced Kabaale Kwagala Olivia, and she served on the Committee on Rules, Discipline and Privileges and the Committee on Gender, Labour and Social Development.

Personal life 
She was a wife to Ibrahim Tooto and a mother to one child.

See also 
List of members of the tenth Parliament of Uganda
Parliament of Uganda
National Resistance Movement

References

External links 
 Iganga District Local Government

National Resistance Movement politicians
Women members of the Parliament of Uganda
Members of the Parliament of Uganda
21st-century Ugandan politicians
21st-century Ugandan women politicians
1986 births
2017 deaths
Deaths in childbirth